Dr. Subhash Saini is a senior computer scientist at NASA. He received a Ph.D. from the University of Southern California and has held positions at University of California, Los Angeles (UCLA), University of California, Berkeley (UCB), and Lawrence Livermore National Laboratory (LLNL).

Publications 
 
He had published 257 peer-reviewed papers in journals and conference proceedings in the
areas of High End Computing (HEC).

Books: A chapter in Handbook of Nanostructured Materials and Nanotechnology (Academic
Press).
Editor of three Conference Proceedings including Performance Evaluation and
Engineering on High End Computing Systems

Awards 
 Best technical paper award “Scalable atomistic simulation algorithms for materials research”. SC 2001, in computer architectures and networks category at ACM/IEEE Supercomputing 2001
 Best technical Paper Award “The impact of hyper-threading on processor resource utilization in production applications”, HiPC 2011: 1-10 in computers and NASA engineering applications
 NASA employee of the year award (1993)
 Excellence in Teaching award at USC, 1984

Professional activities 
 Served on program committees of several national and international conferences
including SC 2004 and HiPC, HPPCC IPDPS 2006 Program Committees
 Chairman of ACM Gordon Bell Award “Nobel Prize in Supercomputing” 2015-2017
 Member of the Source Evaluation Board (SEB) for NASA Advanced Supercomputing Services (NACS) one billions dollars contract
 Panelist and reviewer for Exascale Computing Project (ECP) under US President
National Strategic Computing Initiative (NSCI).
 Reviewer and panelist for DOE, DOD, NSF, and NASA IT research.
 Member of US Government Inter Agency Panel for IT strategic research.

NASA people
American people of Indian descent
American computer scientists
Living people
Year of birth missing (living people)